The  is an overnight sleeping car train service in Japan operated jointly by Central Japan Railway Company (JR Central) and West Japan Railway Company (JR West) since July 1998.

Operations
The return train departs from Takamatsu, and is coupled with the Sunrise Izumo from Izumoshi at Okayama Station, departing together from there, and arriving at Tokyo Station in the next morning.

These extended service trains run during particular seasons (Differs each year), and during the holidays.

Sunrise Izumo and Sunrise Seto pass through stations in Nagoya and Kyoto without stopping due to the fact that they arrive at these stations around midnight and are unable to play the announcements.

Station list 

 Trains make brief stops for several reasons, here being crew changes at JR region boundaries. Passengers cannot board or get off the train when it makes such stops.
 Regularly, only eastbound services will operate between Atami and Yokohama via the Tōkaidō Freight Line, where trains enter the line at Odawara and exit at Chigasaki back to the Tōkaidō Main Line.

Formation
Trains are formed of dedicated 7-car 285 series Sunrise Express electric multiple units (EMUs) owned by both JR Central and JR West. They are formed as shown below, with cars numbered 8 to 14 in the down (westbound) direction, with car 14 at the Tokyo end, and 1 to 7 in the up (Tokyo-bound) direction, with car 7 at the Tokyo end.

 Car 2/9 has a wheelchair-accessible compartment
 Each car has toilet facilities at one end.
 Smoking is permitted in car 6/13, and some compartments in car 4/11.

Accommodation, Ticketing and Facilities
The Sunrise Express services consist of six types of accommodation. There are five types of berths: A Single Deluxe, B Sunrise Twin (2-person use), B Single Twin (1 or 2-person use), B Single and B Solo. There is also a carpeted sleeping space called the Nobinobi sleeping area.

To ride the train, several fares are required.

The berth and seat reservation charges are fixed, regardless of where the journey starts and ends.

Tickets can be purchased up to one month before departure at a JR Midori no Madoguchi in Japan, or online through the JR West Seat Reservation website. Holders of the Japan Rail Pass can reserve a Nobinobi space for free, or reserve a berth by paying the limited express and berth charges.

A shower is located in cars 3 and 10. Passengers using the A Single Deluxe compartments are provided with a free shower card to use the showers on the train, while other passengers have to pay ¥330 for a shower card if they desire to use the showers. Lounges are also located in cars 3 and 10. Drink vending machines are available in cars 3, 5, 10 and 12.

History

The Sunrise Seto services were introduced together with the Sunrise Izumo on 10 July 1998. Previously, the Seto operated as a separate "Blue train" service connecting Tokyo with Takamatsu. The Sunrise Izumo was intended to attract more passengers to train transportation by introducing newly designed trains and by reducing the journey time.

Ridership on overnight trains in Japan continues to decline, and from March 2009, the Sunrise Izumo and Sunrise Seto became the only overnight sleeping car trains to operate west of Tokyo via the Tokaido Line.

From the start of the revised timetable on 12 March 2021, the departure time of the Sunrise Izumo and Sunrise Seto from Tokyo was changed from 10:00 PM to 9:50 PM. It is the first time that the departure time was changed since the services' introduction in 1998. The change cleared the 10:00 PM departure slot for one of the new Shōnan limited express services to Odawara.

See also
 Sunrise Izumo
Seto (train), the blue train predecessor to the Sunrise Seto
 List of named passenger trains of Japan

References

External links

 JR West Sunrise Izumo / Sunrise Seto 

West Japan Railway Company
Named passenger trains of Japan
Night trains of Japan
Railway services introduced in 1998